Andradite is a mineral species of the garnet group. It is a nesosilicate, with formula Ca3Fe2Si3O12.

Andradite includes three varieties:
 Melanite: Black in color, referred to as "titanian andradite".
 Demantoid: Vivid green in color, one of the most valuable and rare stones in the gemological world.
 Topazolite: Yellow-green in color and sometimes of high enough quality to be cut into a faceted gemstone, it is rarer than demantoid.

It was first described in 1868 for an occurrence in Drammen, Buskerud, Norway. Andradite was named after the Brazilian statesman, naturalist, professor and poet José Bonifácio de Andrada e Silva (1763–1838).

Occurrence
It occurs in skarns developed in contact metamorphosed impure limestones or calcic igneous rocks; in chlorite schists and serpentinites and in alkalic igneous rocks (typically titaniferous). Associated minerals include vesuvianite, chlorite, epidote, spinel, calcite, dolomite and magnetite. It is found in Iran, Italy, the Ural Mountains of Russia, Arizona and California and in Dnipropetrovsk Oblast in Ukraine.

Like the other garnets, andradite crystallizes in the cubic space group Iad, with unit-cell parameter of 12.051 Å at 100 K.

The spin structure of andradite contains two mutually canted equivalent antiferromagnetic sublattices below the Néel temperature (TN=11 K).

See also

 Almandine
 Grossular
 Pyrope
 Spessartine
 Tsavorite
 Uvarovite
 Geology
 Mineral
 Mineral collecting

References

External links

Calcium minerals
Iron(III) minerals
Garnet group
Garnet gemstones
Minerals in space group 230
Titanium minerals
Minerals described in 1868